Saint Francis College v. al-Khazraji, 481 U.S. 604 (1987), is a United States labor law case decided by the United States Supreme Court.

Facts
Al-Khazraji, a professor and U.S. citizen born in Iraq, filed suit against his former employer and its tenure committee for denying him tenure on the basis of his Arabian race in violation of 42 U.S.C. Section 1981. The District Court held that while Al-Kharzraji had properly alleged racial discrimination, the record was insufficient to determine whether he had been subjected to prejudice.

The question posed was "Does 42 U.S.C. Section 1981 apply to Arab minorities?"

Judgment
In response to this question the Court held that persons of Arabian ancestry were protected from racial discrimination under Section 1981. Writing for a unanimous Court, Justice White maintained that section 1981 encompassed discrimination even among Caucasians. Justice White noted that history did not support the claim that Arabs and other present-day "Caucasians" were considered to be a single race for the purposes of section 1981.

Justice Brennan, in a separate concurrence, said the following.

Significance
In the companion case, Shaare Tefila v. Cobb, a unanimous Court ruled that the Civil Rights Act of 1866 likewise applies to discrimination against Jews.

See also
 United States labor law
 Civil Rights Act of 1866
 List of United States Supreme Court cases, volume 481
 List of United States Supreme Court cases
 Lists of United States Supreme Court cases by volume
 List of United States Supreme Court cases by the Rehnquist Court.

Notes

External links
 

United States Supreme Court cases
United States labor case law
1987 in United States case law
United States Supreme Court cases of the Rehnquist Court